The Taylor Chapman House is a historic house at 407 Palisado Avenue in Windsor, Connecticut.  Built in 1764, it is a well-preserved example of Georgian architecture executed in brick.  It was listed on the National Register of Historic Places in 1988.

Description and history
The Taylor Chapman House is located north of Windsor's village center, on the west side of Palisado Avenue (Connecticut Route 159) at the northwest of its junction with Kennedy Road. Palisado Avenue is a historically old road that was once the main road paralleling the west bank of the Connecticut River. It is built out of brick, with a side gable roof and end chimneys, and rests on a stone foundation. It originally had two chimneys on each end wall, but now each has only one. The main facade is five bays across, with a center entrance topped by a half-round transom window. Windows are set in rectangular openings, with stone sills and lintels of soldier bricks. A single-story ell extends to the rear, and the property includes a 20th-century garage.

The house was built in 1764 by Taylor Chapman, and is one of a small number of surviving Georgian brick houses in Windsor.  It is located near the road that lead to the historic Bissell Ferry crossing, which connected Windsor with East Windsor Hill.

See also
National Register of Historic Places listings in Windsor, Connecticut

References

Houses on the National Register of Historic Places in Connecticut
National Register of Historic Places in Hartford County, Connecticut
Georgian architecture in Connecticut
Houses completed in 1764
Houses in Windsor, Connecticut